Miss Europe 1956 was the 19th edition of the Miss Europe pageant and the eighth edition under the Mondial Events Organization. It was held in Stockholm, Sweden on 1 June 1956. Margit Nünke of Germany, was crowned Miss Europe 1956 by out going titleholder Inga-Britt Söderberg of Finland.

Results

Placements

Contestants 

 - Traudl Eichinger
 - Rosette Ghislain
 - Ilena Nelson
 - Sirpa Helena Koivu
 - Gisèle Charbit
 - Margit Nünke
 - Rona Karakasi (Rena Karakasi)
 - Rita Schmidt
 - Phyllis Glass
 - Brunella Tocci
 - Ingrid Goude
 - Yvonne Bridel
 - Ayşe Banu Denizli

Notes

Returns

Withdrawals

References

External links 
 

Miss Europe
1956 beauty pageants
1956 in Sweden